The group stage of the 2005 CAF Confederation Cup was played from 23 July to 16 October 2005. A total of eight teams competed in the group stage.

Format
In the group stage, each group was played on a home-and-away round-robin basis. The winners of each group advanced directly to the final.

Groups

Group A
{|class="wikitable" style="text-align: center;"
!width="175"|Team
!width="20"|Pts
!width="20"|Pld
!width="20"|W
!width="20"|D
!width="20"|L
!width="20"|GF
!width="20"|GA
!width="20"|GD
|- align=center bgcolor=ccffcc
|style="text-align:left;"| FAR Rabat
|16||6||5||1||0||7||2||+5||Final
|- align=center
|style="text-align:left;"| King Faisal Babes
|12||6||4||0||2||9||5||+4
|-bgcolor=FFFFFF
|style="text-align:left;"| AS Marsa
|7||6||2||1||3||6||6||0
|-bgcolor=FFFFFF
|style="text-align:left;"| Fello Star
|0||6||0||0||6||2||11||-9
|}

|}

Group B
{|class="wikitable" style="text-align: center;"
!width="175"|Team
!width="20"|Pts
!width="20"|Pld
!width="20"|W
!width="20"|D
!width="20"|L
!width="20"|GF
!width="20"|GA
!width="20"|GD
|- align=center bgcolor=ccffcc
|style="text-align:left;"| Dolphins FC
|14||6||4||2||0||10||4||+6||Final
|- align=center
|style="text-align:left;"| Ismaily
|11||6||3||2||1||11||4||+7
|-bgcolor=FFFFFF
|style="text-align:left;"| Al-Mokawloon Al-Arab
|6||6||2||0||4||6||8||-2
|-bgcolor=FFFFFF
|style="text-align:left;"| FC 105 Libreville
|3||6||1||0||5||4||15||-11
|}

|}

References

External links
2005 CAF Confederation Cup - goalzz.com

Group stage